The Broken Commandment is a Japanese novel written by Tōson Shimazaki published in 1906 (late Meiji period) under the title Hakai (破戒). The novel deals with the burakumin, formerly known as eta. This book enjoyed great popularity and influence in Japan.

Plot
The basic plot concerns a school teacher named Ushimatsu Segawa (family name written last) who struggles with a commandment given to him by his late father. He is never to reveal his burakumin background, which his father had tried so hard to conceal as well. Ushimatsu idolizes Rentarou Inoko, a burakumin rights' activist and successful writer (particularly considering the social position given to those considered burakumin). Ushimatsu wishes to reveal his background to Rentarou, as his need to hide away part of himself in order to be accepted by society in general leads to his feeling constricted by this superficial identity, and to his desiring to form a more meaningful connection with Rentarou through their common experience.

This novel also touches on the dangerous, destructive nature of gossip, and questions society's inability to accept what is not understood. It attempts to build understanding and empathy for this group of people at a time (the novel's publication's) when a great deal of prejudice still existed towards this group.

Writing
Toson's The Broken Commandment was completed under impecunious circumstances.  After the idea of the novel was formulated, Toson approached his father-in-law, Hata Keiji, and a wealthy landlord, Kozu Takeshi, asking for their support in his full-time writing of the novel.  They agreed, and Toson quit his job as a teacher.  With his pregnant wife and three daughters Toson left Komoro and moved to Minami Toshima-gun in Tokyo to complete his work.  His three daughters died one after another, from meningitis and intestinal catarrh, and Toson came to regard their deaths as "sacrifices" − their deaths were most likely triggered by malnutrition which deprived them from "maintaining adequate physical resistance to the fatal diseases because of the tightly budgeted life Toson subjected his family to".

Film adaptations
The Broken Commandment has been repeatedly adapted into films:
 1946: Hakai, dir. Yutaka Abe
 1948: Apostasy, dir. Keisuke Kinoshita
 1962: The Outcast, dir. Kon Ichikawa

Bibliography
 Title: The broken commandment, Japan Foundation translation series, Kokusai Kōryū Kikin, UNESCO collection of representative works: Japanese series
 Author: Tōson Shimazaki
 Editor: Tōson Shimazaki
 Translated: Kenneth Strong
 Collaborator: Kenneth Strong
 Edition: reprinted
 Editor:	University of Tokyo Press, 1974
 , 9780860081913
 249 pages

References

1906 novels
Novels by Tōson Shimazaki
Japanese novels adapted into films
1906 debut novels
Novels set in Nagano Prefecture